Captain Sir Andrew Snape Hamond, 1st Baronet (17 December 1738 – 12 September 1828) was a British naval officer and Lieutenant Governor of Nova Scotia from 1781 to 1782 and Comptroller of the Navy from 1794 to 1828.

Career
Born in Blackheath, London, England, the son of Robert Hamond and Susannah Snape, he joined the Royal Navy in 1753 and served during the Seven Years' War and the American Revolution. In 1765, he was made a commander and a captain in 1770.

During the American Revolution he commanded North American station in the Expedition to the Chesapeake (1777) and commanded a warship during the defence of Sandy Hook in 1778, for which he was knighted.

Hamond was appointed Lieutenant Governor of Nova Scotia in 1781, administering Nova Scotia in the absence of Governor Francis Legge, who had been recalled to England, but not replaced, some years before. He  ordered troops to end the Raid on Lunenburg, Nova Scotia (1782). He had expected to be named Legge's successor, but John Parr was named to the position instead. Offended, Hamond resigned as lieutenant-governor soon after Parr's arrival. From 1780 until 1784 he was additionally appointed Resident Commissioner of the Navy, Halifax Nova Scotia.

In 1783, Hamond was awarded a baronetcy. He became Commander-in-Chief, The Nore in 1785 and Comptroller of the Navy from 1794 to his death.  He also was a member of the Court for the Court-Martial of the crew members captured on Tahiti who were involved in the Mutiny on the Bounty.

From 1796 to 1806, he was a Member of Parliament for Ipswich. He was elected a Fellow of the Royal Society in 1797.

Legacy
Settlers of Hammonds Plains, a new settlement outside of Halifax, voted to name their area after the popular Lt. Governor. The Lady Hammond Road, a new main road out of Halifax constructed by Hamond, was named after his wife Cecilia. Cape Hamond in Alaska, now Cape Saint Elias, was also named in his honour, as was the Hammond River in New Brunswick.
He is the namesake of Sir Andrew Hammond (1800 ship).

Family
He married Cecilia Sutherland in April 1763. They had no children. He married Anne Graeme in March 1779. They had two children: Admiral of the Fleet Sir Graham Hamond, 2nd Baronet and Caroline Hamond.

References

External links

|-

|-

|-

1738 births
1828 deaths
Baronets in the Baronetage of Great Britain
Members of the Parliament of Great Britain for Ipswich
Governors of the Colony of Nova Scotia
Royal Navy officers
People from Blackheath, London
Military personnel from London
UK MPs 1801–1802
UK MPs 1802–1806
Royal Navy personnel of the Seven Years' War
Fellows of the Royal Society
British MPs 1796–1800
Members of the Parliament of the United Kingdom for Ipswich
Royal Navy personnel of the American Revolutionary War